A caravanserai (or caravansary) was a roadside inn where travelers (caravaners) could rest and recover from the day's journey. Caravanserais supported the flow of commerce, information and people across the network of trade routes covering Asia, North Africa and Southeast Europe, most notably the Silk Road. Often located along rural roads in the countryside, urban versions of caravanserais were also historically common in cities throughout the Islamic world, and were often called other names such as khan, wikala, or funduq.

Terms and etymology

Caravanserai
Caravanserai, is the Persian compound word variant combining kārvān "caravan" with -sarāy "palace", "building with enclosed courts". Here "caravan" means a group of traders, pilgrims or other travellers, engaged in long-distance travel. The word is also rendered as caravansary, caravansaray, caravanseray, caravansara, and caravansarai. In scholarly sources, it is often used as an umbrella term for multiple related types of commercial buildings similar to inns or hostels, whereas the actual instances of such buildings had a variety of names depending on the region and the local language. However, the term was typically preferred for rural inns built along roads outside of city walls.

Khan
The word khan derives from Middle Persian hʾn''' (xān, "house"). It could refer to an "urban caravanserai" built within a town or a city, or generally to any caravanserai, including those built in the countryside and along desert routes. In Turkish the word is rendered as han. The same word was used in Bosnian and Bulgarian, having arrived through Ottoman conquest. In addition to Turkish and Persian, the term was widely used in Arabic as well, and examples of such buildings are found throughout the Middle East from as early as the Ummayyad period. The term han is also used in Romanian being adopted from Ottoman Turkish.

Funduq

The term funduq (sometimes spelled foundouk or fondouk from the French transliteration) is frequently used for historic inns in Morocco and around western North Africa. The word comes from Greek pandocheion, lit.: "welcoming all", thus meaning 'inn', led to funduq in Arabic, pundak in Hebrew, fundaco in Venice, fondaco in Genoa and alhóndiga or fonda in Spanish (funduq is the origin of Spanish term fonda). In the cities of this region such buildings were also frequently used as housing for artisan workshops.

Wikala
The Arabic word wikala, sometimes spelled wakala or wekala, is a term found frequently in historic Cairo for an urban caravanserai which housed merchants and their goods and served as a center for trade, storage, transactions and other commercial activity. The word wikala means roughly "agency" in Arabic, in this case a commercial agency, which may also have been a reference to the customs offices that could be located here to deal with imported goods. The term khan was also frequently used for this type of building in Egypt.

History

Caravanserais were a common feature not only along the Silk Road, but also along the Achaemenid Empire's Royal Road, a  ancient highway that stretched from Sardis to Susa according to Herodotus: "Now the true account of the road in question is the following: Royal stations exist along its whole length, and excellent caravanserais; and throughout, it traverses an inhabited tract, and is free from danger." Other significant urban caravanserais were built along the Grand Trunk Road in the Indian subcontinent, especially in the region of Mughal Delhi and Bengal Subah.

Throughout most of the Islamic period (7th century and after), caravanserais were a common type of structure both in the rural countryside and in dense urban centers across the Middle East, North Africa, and Ottoman Europe. A number of 12th to 13th-century caravanserais or hans were built throughout the Seljuk Empire, many examples of which have survived across Turkey today (e.g. the large Sultan Han in Aksaray Province) as well as in Iran (e.g. the Ribat-i Sharaf in Khorasan). Urban versions of caravanserais also became important centers of economic activity in cities across these different regions of the Muslim world, often concentrated near the main souq areas, with many examples still standing in the historic areas of Damascus, Aleppo, Cairo, Istanbul, Fes, etc.

Ibn Battuta, a 14th-century Muslim traveler, described the function of a caravenserai in the region of China:

In many parts of the Muslim world, caravanserais also provided revenues that were used to fund charitable or religious functions or buildings. These revenues and functions were managed through a waqf, a protected agreement which gave certain buildings and revenues the status of mortmain endowments guaranteed under Islamic law.Behrens-Abouseif, Doris. 2007. Cairo of the Mamluks: A History of Architecture and its Culture. Cairo: The American University in Cairo Press. Many major religious complexes in the Ottoman and Mamluk empires, for example, either included a caravanserai building (like in the külliye of the Süleymaniye Mosque in Istanbul) or drew revenues from one in the area (such as the Wikala al-Ghuri in Cairo, which was built to contribute revenues for the nearby complex of Sultan al-Ghuri).

Caravanserai in Arab literature
Al-Muqaddasi the Arab geographer wrote in 985 CE about the hostelries, or wayfarers' inns, in the Province of Palestine, a province at that time listed under the topography of Syria, saying: "Taxes are not heavy in Syria, with the exception of those levied on the Caravanserais (Fanduk); Here, however, the duties are oppressive..." The reference here being to the imposts and duties charged by government officials on the importation of goods and merchandise, the importers of which and their beasts of burden usually stopping to take rest in these places. Guards were stationed at every gate to ensure that taxes for these goods be paid in full, with the revenues going to the Fatimid kingdom of Egypt.

Architecture

Most typically a caravanserai was a building with a square or rectangular walled exterior, with a single portal wide enough to permit large or heavily laden beasts such as camels to enter. The courtyard was almost always open to the sky, and the inside walls of the enclosure were outfitted with a number of identical animal stalls, bays, niches or chambers to accommodate merchants and their servants, animals, and merchandise.

Caravanserais provided water for human and animal consumption, washing and ritual purification such as wudu and ghusl. Sometimes they had elaborate public baths (hammams), or other attached amenities such as a fountain or a sabil/sebil. They kept fodder for animals and had shops for travellers where they could acquire new supplies. Some shops bought goods from the travelling merchants. Many caravanserais were equipped with small mosques, such as the elevated examples in the Seljuk and Ottoman caravanserais in Turkey.

In Cairo, starting in the Burji Mamluk period, wikalas (urban caravanserais) were frequently several stories tall and often included a rab', a low-income rental apartment complex, which was situated on the upper floors while the merchant accommodations occupied the lower floors. While making the best use of limited space in a crowded city, this provided the building with two sources of revenue which were managed through the waqf system.

Notable caravanserais

Alphabetically, not taking article (al-, el-, etc.) into consideration.
Abbasi Hotel, Isfahan, Iran
Ağzıkara Han, Ağzıkarahan (Aksaray Province), Turkey
Akbari Sarai, Lahore, Pakistan
Aminoddole Carvansarai, in the Kashan Bazaar, Kashan, Iran
Büyük Han, Nicosia, Cyprus
Büyük Valide Han, Istanbul, Turkey
Büyük Yeni Han, Istanbul, Turkey
Caravanserai of Sa'd al-Saltaneh, Qazvin, Iran
Caravanserai of Zor, Iğdır, Turkey
Corral del Carbón, Granada, Spain
Elbasan Han, Korçë, Albania
Funduq Nejjarine, Fes, Morocco
Funduq Sagha, Fes, Morocco
Funduq Shamma'in, Fes, Morocco
Funduq Staouniyyin, Fes, Morocco
Garghabazar Caravanserai, Kharabakh, Azerbaijan
Kapan Han, Skopje, North Macedonia
Khan As'ad Pasha, Damascus, Syria
Khan Jaqmaq, Damascus, Syria
Khan el-Khalili, Cairo, Egypt
Khan Sulayman Pasha, Damascus, Syria
Khan al-Tujjar, Mount Tabor, Israel
Khan al-Tujjar, Nablus, West Bank
Khan Tuman, Damascus, Syria
Khan al-Umdan, Acre, Israel
Koza Han, Bursa, Turkey
Kürkçü Han, Istanbul, Turkey
Kuršumli An, Skopje, North Macedonia
Manuc's Inn, Bucharest, Romania
Morića Han, Sarajevo, Bosnia and Herzegovina
Multani Caravanserai, Baku, Azerbaijan
Mughal Sarai, Surat, Gujarat, India
Nampally Sarai, Nampally, Hyderabad, India
Orbelian's Caravanserai, Armenia
Rabati Malik, Uzbekistan
Shaki Caravanserai, Shaki, Azerbaijan
Stari Han, Kremna, Užice, Serbia
Suli An, Skopje, North Macedonia
Sultan Han, Sultanhanı (Aksaray Province), Turkey
Sultan Han, Sultanhanı (Kayseri Province), Turkey
Wikala al-Ghuri, Cairo, Egypt
Wikala Qaytbay (at al-Azhar), Cairo, Egypt
Wikala Qaytbay (at Bab al-Nasr), Cairo, Egypt
Zeinodin Caravanserai, Zein-o-din, Yazd, Iran

Gallery

See also

References

Further reading
 Branning, Katharine. 2018. turkishhan.org, The Seljuk Han in Anatolia. New York, USA.
 Cytryn-Silverman, Katia. 2010. The Road Inns (Khans) in Bilad al-Sham. BAR (British Archaeological Reports), Oxford. 
 
 Erdmann, Kurt, Erdmann, Hanna. 1961. Das anatolische Karavansaray des 13. Jahrhunderts, 3 vols. Berlin: Mann, 1976, 

 Hillenbrand, Robert. 1994. Islamic Architecture: Form, function and meaning. New York: Columbia University Press. (see Chapter VI for an in depth overview of the caravanserai).
 Kiani, Mohammad Yusef. 1976. Caravansaries in Khorasan Road. Reprinted from: Traditions Architecturales en Iran, Tehran, No. 2 & 3, 1976.
 Schutyser, Tom. 2012. Caravanserai: Traces, Places, Dialogue in the Middle East. Milan: 5 Continents Editions, 
 Yavuz, Aysil Tükel. 1997. The Concepts that Shape Anatolian Seljuq Caravansara. In: Gülru Necipoglu (ed). 1997. Muqarnas XIV: An Annual on the Visual Culture of the Islamic World.'' Leiden: E. J. Brill, 80–95. [archnet.org/library/pubdownloader/pdf/8967/doc/DPC1304.pdf Available online as a PDF document, 1.98 MB]

External links

 Shah Abbasi Caravanserai, Tishineh
 Caravansara Pictures
 Consideratcaravanserai.net, Texts and photos on research on caravanserais and travel journeys in Middle East and Central Asia.
 Caravanserais (Kervansaray) in Turkey
 The Seljuk Han in Anatolia
 Persian Caravanserai, UNESCO application

 
Hotel types
Islamic architecture
Architecture in Iran
Silk Road
Persian words and phrases